is a Japanese anthology manga written and illustrated by Koyoharu Gotouge and published by Shueisha. It features four one-shot stories published between 2013 and 2015.

Publication
Koyoharu Gotouge's Short Stories features four one-shot stories by Koyoharu Gotouge: , launched in 2013;  published in the 2nd issue of Jump Next! in 2014;  published in Weekly Shōnen Jump in 2014; and  published in Weekly Shōnen Jump in 2015. Shueisha released the collected tankōbon volume on October 4, 2019.

It has been licensed in Italy by Star Comics, in France by Panini and in Argentina by Editorial Ivrea.

Chapter list

References

2019 manga
Dark fantasy anime and manga
Manga anthologies
Shōnen manga
Shueisha manga